Clydesdale Bank is a trading name used by Clydesdale Bank plc for its retail banking operations in Scotland.

In June 2018, it was announced that Clydesdale Bank's holding company CYBG would acquire Virgin Money for £1.7 billion in an all-stock deal, and that the Clydesdale Bank, Yorkshire Bank and B brands would be phased out in favour of retaining Virgin Money's brand. CYBG plc's other banking businesses, B, Virgin Money and Yorkshire Bank currently operate as trading divisions of Clydesdale Bank plc under its banking licence.

History

Banknotes

Following the announcement of the CYBG's takeover of Virgin Money in 2018 and planned phasing-out of the Clydesdale Bank brand by 2021 in favour of Virgin Money, it was announced that Virgin Money would continue to issue banknotes under the Clydesdale brand after 2021.

Banknote history
Until prevented by the Bank Charter Act 1844, privately owned banks in Great Britain and Ireland were permitted to issue their own banknotes, and money issued by provincial Scottish, English, Welsh and Irish banking companies circulated freely as a means of payment. While the Bank of England eventually gained a monopoly for issuing banknotes in England and Wales, banks in Scotland and Northern Ireland retained the right to issue their own banknotes and continue to do so to this day. In Scotland, Clydesdale Bank, The Royal Bank of Scotland and Bank of Scotland still print their own banknotes.

2009 issue
The current designs were released in autumn 2009. The obverse designs feature famous Scots while the reverse designs feature Scotland's UNESCO World Heritage Sites.

Previous issue

The previous series of Clydesdale notes each depicted a notable person from Scottish history:

 5 pound note featuring Robert Burns on the obverse and a vignette of a field mouse from Burns' poem To a Mouse on the reverse
 10 pound note featuring Mary Slessor on the front and a vignette of a map of Calabar and African missionary scenes on the back
 20 pound note featuring Robert the Bruce on the front and a vignette of the Bruce on horseback with the Monymusk Reliquary against a background of Stirling Castle on the back
 50 pound note featuring Adam Smith on the front and a vignette of industry tools against a background of sailing ships on the back
 100 pound note featuring Lord Kelvin on the front and a vignette of the University of Glasgow on the back

An image of Adam Smith also features on the £20 note issued in 2007 by the Bank of England, granting Smith the unique status of being the only person to feature on banknotes issued by two different British banks, and the first Scot to appear on a Bank of England banknote.

Older issues
The Clydesdale Bank ceased issuing £1 notes in the late 1980s. These latterly had an image of Robert the Bruce, whilst the contemporaneous £20 notes had an image of Lord Kelvin.

The £10 notes issued from 1971 bore an image of Scottish explorer David Livingstone with palm tree leaves and an illustration of African tribesmen on the back. A later issue showed Livingstone against a background graphic of a map of his Zambezi expedition, showing the River Zambezi, Victoria Falls, Lake Nyasa and Blantyre, Malawi; on the reverse, the African figures were replaced with an image of Livingstone's birthplace in Blantyre.

Commemorative banknotes
Occasionally the Clydesdale Bank issues special commemorative banknotes to mark particular occasions or to celebrate famous people. These notes are much sought-after by collectors and they rarely remain long in circulation. Examples to date have included:

 a £5 issued in 1996 to commemorate the poetry of Robert Burns. On the front of the notes is an overprint of his poems above the portrait.
 a £10 issued in 1997 to commemorate the work of Mary Slessor. On the back of the note is the map of Calabar and Mary Slessor along with a group of Africans.
 a £20 to the Commonwealth Heads of Government Meeting in Edinburgh, October 1997, showing on the reverse the Edinburgh International Conference Centre where the meeting was held, along with Edinburgh Castle in the background and the new Clydesdale Bank building at Tollcross, Edinburgh
 a £20 note to mark Glasgow's celebrations as UK City of Architecture and Design, featuring a portrait of Glaswegian architect Alexander "Greek" Thomson; on the reverse is an illustration of the Lighthouse building by Charles Rennie Mackintosh and the dome of Thomson's Holmwood House (1999)
 a £20 to mark the 700th anniversary of Robert the Bruce's coronation, featuring the Coat of Arms used by the Bruce on the front and a narrative commemorating the anniversary on the rear
 a £10 note to mark the bank's sponsorship of the Scottish Commonwealth Games team, depicting the team logo on the front, and on the rear a montage of all the events at the games (2006)
 a £5 note featuring a portrait of the Scottish civil engineer, Sir William Arrol and the image of the Forth Bridge to mark the 125th anniversary of the construction of the bridge; this issue is noted as it is printed on polymer rather than paper (see below).

Polymer banknotes
In March 2015, the Clydesdale Bank became the first bank in Great Britain to issue polymer banknotes. The £5 commemorative notes, issued to commemorate the 125th anniversary of the construction of the Forth Bridge, are printed by De La Rue and are the first in Europe to use the company's "Safeguard" polymer substrate security feature. The notes also use the "Spark Orbital" security feature which depicts a reflective map of Scotland over a transparent "window" in the banknote.

Although the Clydesdale's 2015 issue are the first plastic banknotes issued within Great Britain, these are not the first polymer banknotes to be issued in the United Kingdom — in 1999, the Northern Bank (now Danske Bank) issued a series of polymer £5 notes depicting the US Space Shuttle. The Bank of England issued a polymer £5 note for the first time in September 2016.

Commonwealth Games

In March 2005, Clydesdale Bank became one of the official partners of the Scottish Commonwealth Games Team, at the 2006 Commonwealth Games in Melbourne, Australia. This sponsorship builds on the relationship formed by its parent, NAB Group, who are one of the Games' main sponsors as well as a key partner with the Australian team, whilst the sister company, Bank of New Zealand, has joined forces to support its national team.  The bank also released a series of Ten Pound (£10) notes with a Commonwealth Games related theme for the occasion.

See also

References

External links

 
 Clydesdale Banknotes
 

 
Banks of Scotland
Companies based in Glasgow
Clydesdale
Banks established in 1838
Scottish brands
1838 establishments in Scotland